The Astor Prince's Trophy was a women's 72-hole stroke play amateur golf tournament played at Prince's Golf Club in Sandwich, Kent from 1961 to 1969.

The event was dropped after 1969 because of a busy schedule. The Ladies' British Open Amateur Stroke Play Championship was established in 1969 and both events were played that year.

Winners

The event was revived in 1971 as a one-day 27-hole event, with Jennifer Smith winning. In 1972 Sally Barber and Angela Bonallack were joint winners. The event was then discontinued.

References

Amateur golf tournaments in the United Kingdom
Women's golf in the United Kingdom
Recurring sporting events established in 1961
Recurring sporting events disestablished in 1969
1961 establishments in England
1969 disestablishments in England